Gavin Thomas Lux (born November 23, 1997) is an American professional baseball second baseman for the Los Angeles Dodgers of Major League Baseball (MLB).

Lux played baseball for Indian Trail High School and Academy in Kenosha, Wisconsin, and was selected in the first round of the 2016 MLB draft by the Dodgers. He made his major league debut in September 2019.

Early life
Lux attended Indian Trail High School and Academy in Kenosha, Wisconsin. He batted .560 for the school in his senior season. He was one of the top 50 high school prospects heading into the 2016 MLB draft. He won the 2016 Wisconsin baseball Gatorade Player of the Year awards and Holy Rosary Sports Night Male Athlete of the Year Award in high school. He had committed to Arizona State University.

Career

Minor leagues
The Los Angeles Dodgers selected Lux in the first round, with the 20th pick overall selection, of the 2016 Major League Baseball draft. Lux signed with the Dodgers for a $2.31 million signing bonus. The Dodgers assigned him to the Arizona League Dodgers to begin his professional career. At the end of the season he was promoted to the Ogden Raptors of the Pioneer Baseball League. Between the two levels, he played in 56 games, batting .296/.375/.399 with 21 RBIs.

Lux got a late start on the 2017 season as he dealt with a rib issue in spring training. He was assigned to the Class-A Great Lakes Loons of the Midwest League on April 19. He played in 101 games for the Loons, hitting .244/.331/.362 with seven home runs, 39 RBIs, and 27 stolen bases. 

He was promoted to the Rancho Cucamonga Quakes of the California League for the 2018 season and was selected to the mid-season all-star game. He was promoted to the Tulsa Drillers of the Texas League in August. He was named to the post-season all-star team with Rancho Cucamonga. and was also named the Dodgers Minor League Player of the year. In 116 games between Rancho Cucamonga and Tulsa, he slashed .324/.399/.514 with 15 home runs and 57 RBIs.

Lux began 2019 with the Tulsa Drillers. He was selected to the mid-season Texas League All-Star Game and also the All-Star Futures Game. He was promoted to the AAA Oklahoma City Dodgers on June 27. He batted .347/421/.607 with 99 runs (2nd in the minor leagues), 61 walks (tied for first in the minors), 8 triples (4th), 26 homers (5th), and 76 RBIs (7th) in 113 combined games in the minors.  Lux was selected as Baseball America's Minor League Player of the Year and also named by the Dodgers as their minor league player of the year for the second straight season.

Los Angeles Dodgers
Lux was called up by the Dodgers to make his major league debut as the starting second baseman against the Colorado Rockies on September 2, 2019. He singled on the first pitch he saw from Peter Lambert and doubled in his second at-bat. He also scored three runs in the game. On September 10, 2019, Lux hit his first MLB home run off Tanner Scott of the Baltimore Orioles. In 23 games with the Dodgers in 2019, he had 18 hits in 75 at-bats (.240 average), hit two home runs and drove in nine runs. On October 3, in his first at-bat in his postseason debut, Lux hit a pinch-hit solo home run off Hunter Strickland of the Washington Nationals. At 21 years and 314 days old, Lux became the youngest player all-time to hit a pinch-hit home run in the postseason. He was also the youngest Dodger to hit a home run in a postseason game, a record previously held by Cody Bellinger, who homered at the age of 22 years and 88 days during the 2017 NLDS against the Arizona Diamondbacks. 

The 2020 season was delayed and shortened by the COVID-19 pandemic and Lux missed the first week of training camp in July and was not able to regain his timing so he was optioned to the team's alternate training site to begin the season. He was not called back up to the Dodgers until the beginning of September and played in only 19 games, hitting .175/.246/.349 with three homers and eight RBIs in 63 at bats. He was left off the post-season roster for the first round then was added back for the second round. He had one plate appearance as a pinch hitter in the series but was left off the roster for the subsequent series.

In 2021, Lux hit .242 with seven homers and 46 RBIs in 102 games. While he primarily played second and short he was moved into the outfield at the end of the season in order to get him more playing time. Lux became the full time second baseman for the Dodgers in the 2022 season, playing in 129 games and batting .276 with six homers and 42 RBI. He also led the National League in triples with seven.

Lux was expected to become the Dodgers starting shortstop for the 2023 season. However on February 27, during a spring training game, his knee buckled while running the bases and he was diagnosed with a torn anterior cruciate ligament in his knee, which is expected to keep him out the entire 2023 season.

Personal life
Lux's parents are Heather and Tom Lux Jr. His uncle, Augie Schmidt, is a former minor league professional baseball player and current head coach of the Carthage College baseball team.

Lux's favorite baseball team growing up in Kenosha was the Milwaukee Brewers.

References

External links

1997 births
Living people
Arizona League Dodgers players
Sportspeople from Kenosha, Wisconsin
Baseball players from Wisconsin
Major League Baseball shortstops
Major League Baseball second basemen
Los Angeles Dodgers players
Ogden Raptors players
Great Lakes Loons players
Rancho Cucamonga Quakes players
Tulsa Drillers players
Oklahoma City Dodgers players